Rowan Marshall (born 24 November 1995) is a professional Australian rules footballer playing for the St Kilda Football Club in the Australian Football League (AFL). He was drafted by St Kilda with their first selection and tenth overall in the 2017 rookie draft.

AFL career
Rowan Marshall was born in 1995 to mother Jan and father Don (a Taranaki rugby union player), the eldest of three brothers. Rowan moved with his parents to Queensland at the age of 18 months. At the age of 3, the family relocated to Victoria settling on a farm at Bolwarra. 

Marshall participated in the Auskick program at Ballarat, Victoria As a junior, Marshall was attracted to the sport instead of his father's and cousins' preference of Rugby Union. In his penultimate year of high school at Bayview College, Marshall was invited to train with the Greater Western Victoria Rebels. Training with the rebels involved a 3-hour each way journey for Marshall, and he played seven games for the club. In 2013 he joined the Portland Tigers in the inaugural Hampden League where he played 12 under-18s matches and kicked three goals in a losing grand final. The following year in 2014 Marshall played for the North Ballarat Rebels and was included in the Vic Country team. Against the Murray Bushrangers in June Marshall was moved into the forward line in the fourth quarter to kick three important match-winning goals, and he recorded 50-plus hit-outs in two consecutive games, against Geelong Falcons and Eastern Ranges, in July. At the end of the season he was invited to the draft combine and was interviewed by several clubs. However, Marshall was not selected in the 2014 AFL Draft. He continued playing in Ballarat with the North Ballarat Roosters and Ballarat league side Sebastopol, and studied at Federation University. Marshall finally met with St Kilda in 2016, who had been scouting him. Marshall was ultimately drafted in the Rookie Draft on 28 November 2016.

Early St Kilda Career 2017-2020 
At the end of the 2017 season, Marshall signed a two year contract extension.

In the 2018 season, Marshall played 12 senior games for St Kilda and was elevated to the senior playing list following the season, having spent 2 seasons on the rookie list. 

Marshall played 20 senior games in the 2019 season, averaging 29 hitouts and 18 disposals. He finished second in the club's best & fairest award, behind midfielder Seb Ross, as well as receiving the club's Lenny Hayes Players' Player Award, as voted by his teammates. Marshall also collected 7 Brownlow Medal votes in 2019, as well as being acknowledged by Champion Data as the most improved player in the AFL based on statistics.

Marshall was partnered in the ruck with Paddy Ryder for the 2020 season, after playing predominantly as a sole ruckman the previous season. In a Covid-limited season, Marshall played a key role in the Saints' reaching finals for the first time since 2011, playing all 19 possible games which included two finals.

2021 Season 
See Also: 2021 St Kilda Football Club Season

Marshall suffered a stress injury in his foot ahead of the 2021 season, and missed the first three matches of the year. Marshall returned to the side in the Round Four win over West Coast, but missed the Saints' Round Five loss to Richmond due to a five-day break with the Saints' medical staff recommending a cautious approach following a plantar fascia injury in the West Coast game. Marshall returned in Round 6 and played four games before further injuring his plantar fascia and undergoing surgery. Marhsall made his return from injury in Round 15. Marshall and teammate Darragh Joyce were forced into isolation after they attended a Wallabies game which turned out to be a Covid19 hotspot. As a result, Marshall, who had flown to Perth, missed the Saints' Round 19 clash with West Coast which St Kilda lost by eight points.Marshall returned the following week ,after completing isolation, and played in the Saints' final four games of the season. In his return against Carlton in Round 20, Marshall had 46 hitouts, five tackles, one goal and 22 disposals. Marshall also impressed with 22 disposals and two goals against Fremantle in Round 23.

Personal life 
Marshall was born in New Zealand to Kiwi parents but moved to a 40-hectare property in Portland, Victoria at a young age. His father Don played rugby in the Taranaki region, and worked at the Portland wharf as well as on the family farm. Marshall's cousins, Rhys Marshall and Callum Gibbins, are both professional rugby union players. During the Covid-19 hiatus of the AFL season in 2020, Marshall assisted his family run their 320 head of cattle farm.

Statistics
Statistics are correct to the end of Round 23 2022

|- style="background-color: #EAEAEA"
! scope="row" style="text-align:center" | 2017
|
| 43 || 1 || 0 || 0 || 5 || 9 || 14 || 4 || 2 || 5 || 0 || 0 || 5 || 9 || 14 || 4 || 2 || 5
|- style="background-color: #EAEAEA"
! scope="row" style="text-align:center" | 2018
|
| 43 || 12 || 6 ||12 || 85 || 75 || 160 || 67 || 28 || 113 || 0.5 || 1.0 || 7.0 || 6.2 || 13.3 || 5.5 || 2.3 || 9.4
|- 
|- style="background-color: #EAEAEA"
! scope="row" style="text-align:center" | 2019
|
| 19 || 20 || 8 || 2 || 198 || 157 || 355 || 83 || 69 || 569 || 0.9 || 0.4 || 9.9 || 7.8 || 17.7 || 4.1 || 3.4 || 28.4
|- style="background-color: #EAEAEA"
! scope="row" style="text-align:center" | 2020 
|
| 19 || 19 || 13 || 11 || 192 || 83 || 266 || 83 || 41 || 277 || 0.6 || 0.5 || 10.1 || 3.8 || 14.0 || 4.3 || 2.1 || 14.5
|- 
|- style="background-color: #EAEAEA"
! scope="row" style="text-align:center" | 2021
|
| 19 || 13 || 9 || 5 || 137 || 66 || 203 || 63 || 39 || 241 || 0.6 || 0.3 || 10.5 || 5.0 || 15.6 || 4.8 || 3.0 || 18.5
|- style="background-color: #EAEAEA"
! scope="row" style="text-align:center" | 2022
|
| 19 || 21 || 9 || 7 || 218 || 118 || 336 || 97 || 66 || 484 || 0.4 || 0.3 || 10.3 || 5.6 || 16.0 || 4.6 || 3.1 || 23.0
|- class="sortbottom"
! colspan=3| Career
! 86
! 45
! 38
! 835
! 499
! 1334
! 397
! 245
! 1689
! 0.5
! 0.4
! 9.7
! 5.8
! 15.5
! 4.6
! 2.8
! 19.6
|}

Notes

References

External links

1995 births
Living people
St Kilda Football Club players
North Ballarat Football Club players
Greater Western Victoria Rebels players
Australian rules footballers from Victoria (Australia)